Mount Larcom railway station is located on the North Coast line in Queensland, Australia. It serves the town of Mount Larcom. It features a single platform with a wooden structure. Opposite lie two passing loops.

Services
Mount Larcom is served by long-distance Traveltrain services; the Spirit of Queensland, Spirit of the Outback and Rockhamption Tilt Train.

References

External links

Mount Larcom station Queensland's Railways on the Internet

Buildings and structures in Central Queensland
Regional railway stations in Queensland
North Coast railway line, Queensland